Short Stories is an EP by American post-punk band Tuxedomoon, released in April 1983 by Les Disques du Crépuscule. In 1986 it was compiled with Suite en sous-sol on CD.
The track The Cage was also recorded in a markedly different instrumental form by band member Steven Brown for his album Composés Pour Le Théâtre Et Le Cinéma, issued on Les Disques du Crépuscule in 1989.

Track listing

Personnel 
Adapted from the Short Stories liner notes.

Tuxedomoon
 Steven Brown – lead vocals, piano (A), Moog synthesizer (B), organ (B), saxophone (B)
 Peter Dachert (as Peter Principle) – guitar, EBow (A), backing vocals (A)
 Blaine L. Reininger – drum programming, backing vocals, synthesizer (A), clarinet (B), keyboards (B)
 Winston Tong – backing vocals

Production and additional personnel
 Gilles Martin – engineering
 Patrick Roques – cover art, design
 Tuxedomoon – production

Release history

References

External links 
 

1983 EPs
Tuxedomoon albums
Les Disques du Crépuscule EPs